The  Internet in Pakistan has been available since the early 1990s. Pakistan has about 123 million internet users, making it the 8th-largest population of internet users in the world. Information and communications technology (ICT) is one of the fastest growing industries in the country. In 2001 just 1.3% of the population used the Internet. By 2006 this figure had grown to 6.5% and in 2012 to 10.0%. As of July 2021; the percentage of internet users in Pakistan is 54%, which translates into approximately 118 million citizens having access to internet.

Status

 Internet users:123 Million broadband subscribers as of January 2023, 8th in the world; 54% of the population.
 Fixed broadband: 2,042,179 subscribers as of November 2019, 28th in the world; 1.7% of the population, 128th in the world (2012). 	
 Mobile broadband: 74,338,910 subscriptions as of November 2019, 10th in the world; 16% of the population, 13th in the world (2012).
 Top level domain: .pk
 Domains registered under the .pk domain: ~30,000 (2012).
 Internet hosts: 365,813 hosts, 57th in the world (2012).
 IPv4: 5.2 million addresses allocated, 0.1% of the world total, 27.2 addresses per 1000 people (2012).
 International bandwidth: ~78 Tbit/s combined from PTCL and TWA (2017).
 Undersea telecommunications cables: Six, SEA-ME-WE 3, SEA-ME-WE 4, IMEWE and AAE-1 operated by PTCL and TWA-1 and SEA-ME-WE 5 operated by Transworld Associates (2012).
 Operational ISPs: ~50 (2012).
 ISPs providing DSL services: Ten (2012).
 ISPs providing broadband cable services: Five (2012).
 ISPs providing Fiber to the Home (FTTH) services: Nayatel (2002), Transworld Home (2015). PTCL, StormFiber, Fiberlink, Optix, WorldCall and Satcomm
 Domestic fiber backbones: PTCL, Wateen, Mobilink, and Multinet (2012).

History

The first dial-up e-mail service was introduced by Digicom Pakistan (Pvt) Limited in 1992–93. The also first dialup internet service started in Pakistan in 1994, by Digicom Pakistan, sharing a 128K link established at Pardesi House R.Y.16 2/1 Old Queen Road, Karachi. Engineer Nasser Khan Ghazi, was the first engineer who installed and commissioned the first-ever internet link at Pardesi House Old Queen Road Karachi in 1994 and became the first person in Pakistan to experience online internet browsing.  

The state-owned Pakistan Telecommunication Company Ltd (PTCL) started offering access via the nationwide local call dialup network in 1995. The country has been pursuing an aggressive IT policy, aimed at boosting Pakistan's drive for economic modernization and creating an exportable software industry. In 2001 Micronet Broadband launched the first DSL service. By the end of 2001, there were as many as 50 Internet Service Providers in the country. 

Pakistan's getting its submarine optic fiber in 2000 also helped the ISP market flourish like never before. Pakistan had almost 128 ISPs in 2007, with customers concentrated in the areas of Islamabad, Karachi, and Lahore.  PTCL offers free dial-up Internet service to all its landline subscribers. 

In 2006 NayaTel began to offer Fiber to the User (FTTU) triple-services in the capital city of Islamabad.

In 2005 Telekom Malaysia acquired 78 per cent equity in Multinet Pakistan, and announced the launch of ‘Project Ittehad.’ The blueprint of the project suggested that the company would lay down 4,500-km of fiber optic cables, which would link 77 cities of the country. The project was estimated to be completed in 14 months and resulted in a highly accessible, fully redundant and resilient DWDM backbone with 20 gigabytes per second operational capacity and 48 cores of dark fiber. Multinet has a 12,000 km long self-healing and scalable optical fiber network covering over 120 cities of Pakistan. 

Broadband access is available in major cities, wireless broadband Internet has been introduced by the Wireless local loop (WLL) networks in many major cities, and Worldwide Interoperability for Microwave Access (WiMAX) networks are being deployed. Most Pakistani companies, educational institutes, and government departments maintain web sites, which has further increased the demand for Internet access.

Language
Most Internet usage in Pakistan is still in English. Many Urdu based newspapers maintain an Urdu presence on the web, however, common usage is often done in romanized Urdu.

Broadband

Pakistan's Government definition of Broadband is contrary to the definition of Broadband in the industrialized world. For example, Pakistan defines broadband as always on 128 kbit/s, while US FCC defines broadband as 20 Mbit/s.  Or a difference in speed of 159 times (15900%). In 2015 Government of Pakistan (GoP) recognised that Telecommunication has become one of the dominant sectors in the economy, contributing to the well-being of society and a major contributor to GDP thus introduced a Telecommunication Policy 2015. The Telecom Policy 2015 aims to facilitate the attainment of an all-embracing national agenda and to transform Pakistan into an economically vibrant, knowledge-based, middle-income country by 2025.

Broadband is offered at speeds that range from 1 Mbit/s to 1 Gbit/s in all major cities. The largest broadband providers for both corporate and residential consumers include PTCL, Wateen, Cybernet (StormFiber), Multinet, Optix, Transworld and Nayatel.

In August 2007, PTCL launched Smart TV, an IPTV (Internet Protocol Television) service. IPTV along with high-speed broadband internet and voice telephony is available on the subscribers existing telephone lines.

PTCL provides wireless broadband using the Evolution-Data Optimized (EV-DO) Rev. A standard, with speeds of up to 3.1 Mbit/s. PTCL provides its service under the brand name EVO which is available in more than 100 cities.

Nayatel is offering multiple value-added services as well other than the basic tagline of voice, video, and data. The VAS includes Surveillance Solutions, IT solutions, Web Hosting, Gaming Solutions, IPTV, Data Security and VOD.

StormFiber (powered by Cybernet) and Optix Pakistan have developed good market among consumers by providing FTTH and FTTX services including value added services like digital television, IPTV services. Internet packages varies from 2Mbit/s to 100Mbit/s 

Wateen Telecom launched its WiMAX services in Pakistan in 2007. Connections are available at speeds from 256 kbit/s to 9.8 Mbit/s. PTCL offers Pakistan fastest WiMAX connection EVO Wingle at 9.3 Mbit/s. PTA issued the License to Telenor, Zong, Ufone, Jazz to launch 3G and 4G services in form of wireless broadband. 

In 2016, Wi-tribe signed a contract with Huawei to Launch 4.5G LTE Advanced Internet in Pakistan. This technology Advancement is not only new in Pakistan but in South Asia & Middle East too. The first stage has been completed in Lahore and Karachi, which is providing the most Advanced Generation of Internet speeds .i.e. 4.5G to users. In 2021, the PTA (Pakistan Telecommunication Authority) revoked Wi-tribe's license because of frequent service interruptions.

Between 2019 and 2021, major cell sites of Zong, Jazz and Telenor were upgraded to support LTE-A, allowing the use of carrier aggregation on modern smartphones that support the technology.

On 22 August 2019, Pakistan became the first South Asian country to test 5G services. The successful tests were conducted by Pakistani telecom company Zong.

The country is reported to have 5G services launched by December 2022, however experts believe it will take more than 3–4 years for country to fully deploy 5G services in the country.

In April 2021, the PTA announced that broadband subscriptions in Pakistan had reached the 100 million users mark.

Right of way draft rules 2018 
Major hindrance in providing internet services in Pakistan is acquiring Right of Way from public and private authorities (Owners of Right of Way) Over the last few years, there have been many instances reported to PTA and MoIT&T related to Right-of-Way (RoW) disputes. These have come from telecom operators who cite undue demands from various public bodies (owners of RoW). MoIT&T began a process of consultation with all relevant stakeholders to develop a standard mechanism for addressing the long-standing issue of RoW being faced by telecom operators and has prepared draft RoW rules. The Telecom Authority (PTA) is actively pursuing and participating in finalizing the RoW Rules in the larger interest of the telecom sector.

E-commerce 

Pakistan e-commerce industry is worth an estimated US$4 billion.
According to the Oxford Dictionary, e-commerce refers to commercial transactions conducted electronically on the internet.

Pakistan's first e-commerce company was started in 2001 with the establishment of Beliscity.pk by Abid Beli. Since then the market has grown steadily until 2012, which was an inflection point in the industry.

In 2018, Government of Pakistan reformulated the Digital Pakistan Policy: one that takes into account its increasingly transformed role across all sectors of socio-economic development; their accelerated digitization, and transformational modernization into integrated components of a holistic knowledge based economy. With this in mind, Ministry of IT & Telecom (MoIT) has formulated this policy document based on a multi-stakeholder model which includes infrastructure development, digitization including e-Agriculture, e-Health, e-Energy, e-Commerce, e-Justice, ICT Education, IoT, FinTech, Artificial Intelligence & Robotics, Cloud Computing and Big Data

There was sudden growth in online business during 2020 COVID-19 pandemic in Pakistan, majority of business suddenly move to online market. Due to this drastic change web hosting companies business increases from 2020 to onward.

Presidential Initiative for Artificial Intelligence & Computing (PIAIC) 
President of Pakistan Dr. Arif Alvi started a Presidential Initiative for Artificial Intelligence & Computing (PIAIC) the mission of which is to reshape Pakistan by revolutionizing education, research, and business by adopting latest, cutting-edge technologies. Experts are calling this the 4th industrial revolution.

See also

References

External links 

 Pakistan Telecommunication Coverage Footprint (maps), Pakistan Telecommunication Authority.
 PKNIC, administrator of the .PK domain name space.

 
Telecommunications in Pakistan
Information technology in Pakistan